The Dormant Power is a 1917 American silent drama film, directed by Travers Vale and starring Ethel Clayton, Montagu Love and Muriel Ostriche.

Cast
 Ethel Clayton as Christine Brent 
 Joseph Herbert as James Brent 
 Edward Langford as Carl Randolph 
 Montagu Love as Maurice Maxwell 
 Muriel Ostriche as Metta 
 George Morgan as Brinkerhoff

References

Bibliography
 Langman, Larry. American Film Cycles: The Silent Era. Greenwood Publishing, 1998.

External links
 

1917 films
1917 drama films
1910s English-language films
American silent feature films
Silent American drama films
Films directed by Travers Vale
American black-and-white films
World Film Company films
Films shot in Fort Lee, New Jersey
1910s American films